The International Society for Analysis, its Applications and Computation (ISAAC) was founded at the University of Delaware in 1996 and is dedicated to the promotion of mathematical analysis and its applications. It has organized international congresses biannually since 1996 and supported regional conferences in various fields of analysis in developing countries since then. The society has members from all continents. Robert Gilbert (University of Delaware), Heinrich Begehr (Free University Berlin), MW Wong (York University), Michael Ruzhansky (Imperial College London), Luigi Rodino (University of Turin) and Michael Reissig (TU Bergakademie Freiberg) served as its past presidents. 

The current president is Uwe Kähler (University of Aveiro).

Conferences 
International congresses organized by ISAAC took place in:
 University of Delaware (1996)
 Fukuoka University (1998)
 Free University Berlin (2001)
 Toronto University (2003)
 University of Catania (2005)
 Ankara University (2007)
 Imperial College London (2009)
 Peoples' Friendship University of Russia (2011)
 Krakow University (2013)
 University of Macao (2015)
 Linnaeus University Växjö (2017)
 University of Aveiro (2019)
 Ghent University (2021) (in online form)
These congresses have attracted an increasing number of analysts and applied mathematicians from around the world. The next congresses will take place at the University of Sao Paulo - Ribeirao Preto in 2023 and at the Nazarbayev University in Nur-Sultan (Kazakhstan) in 2025.

References 

Academic organizations based in the United States
Organizations established in 1996
1996 establishments in Delaware
International scientific organizations